Gerrit Zegelaar (born Loenen aan de Vecht 16 July 1719 – Wageningen 24 July 1794) was a Dutch painter.

Zegelaar was born as son of the carpenter and alderman Hendrik Zegelaar and Johanna ter Bruggen. Gerrit was a deaf mute. He settled in Amsterdam where in 1757 he married Maria van der Steen. The marriage remained childless.

Zegelaar was a pupil of Nicolaas Verkolje and is known for small genre paintings that were often sold by pairs, and for portraits, but also made wall decorations. He worked in Haarlem and Amsterdam. He painted a wall decoration for the owner Quarles van Ufford on the house located at Spaarne 106. His works were collected by Gerrit Braamcamp and Jan Gildemeester.

In 1785 he was insolvent and left Amsterdam, but in 1788 met with financial trouble again and then left Utrecht where he had been living. He then retired to Wageningen, the city where his father had been born. Zegelaar died there 6 years later.

Literature 
 E. Munnig Schmidt, "Gerrit Zegelaar. Een 18e-eeuwse kunstschilder uit Loenen a/d Vecht", in Jaarboekje Oudheidkundig Genootschap Niftarlake 2002, p. 62-84

References

1719 births
1794 deaths
18th-century Dutch painters
18th-century Dutch male artists
Dutch male painters
People from Loenen